Derek Stark may refer to:

 Derek Stark (footballer) (born 1958), Scottish footballer
 Derek Stark (rugby union) (born 1966), Scottish rugby union player